In Greek mythology, Armenius (Ancient Greek: Ἀρμενίου) or Harmenius was the son of Zeuxippus, son of King Eumelus of Pherae. He was the father of Henioche, mother of  Melanthus by Andropompus.

Note 

Characters in Greek mythology